The 1944 Denver Pioneers football team was an American football team that represented the University of Denver as member of the Mountain States Conference (MSC) during the 1944 college football season. Led by head coaches Adam Esslinger and Cac Hubbard, the team compiled a 4–3–2 record (2–1–1 against conference opponents), finished second in the MSC, and outscored opponents by a total of 193 to 120.

Schedule

References

Denver
Denver Pioneers football seasons
Denver Pioneers football